"Two Can Play That Game" is a song by American R&B singer Bobby Brown from his third album, Bobby (1992). The single release was remixed by K-Klass and originally reached  38 on the UK Singles Chart in June 1994. In April 1995, it re-entered the chart, peaking at No. 3. It received positive reviews from music critics and also reached No. 3 in the Netherlands. Additionally, it became a top-20 hit in Belgium (Flanders and Wallonia), Denmark, Finland, Ireland, and Italy. On the Eurochart Hot 100, "Two Can Play That Game" peaked at No. 10. This version of the song appeared on Brown's remix album of the same name, released later in 1995.

Critical reception
Larry Flick from Billboard stated that "Two Can Play That Game" has been "revamped brilliantly" by the "unstoppable" British electronic music group K-Klass. In his weekly UK chart commentary, James Masterton noted that the track has been "drastically remixed" by the remixers, becoming a record "that towers head and shoulders over the original mix." He added, "Whereas the original album track was a fairly average piece of swingbeat, K-Klass' reworking transforms it into one of the more brilliant pop hits of recent months." Andy Beevers from Music Week rated the remix four out of five, stating that "their catchy and commercial piano-powered treatment has helped take the tune to the upper reaches of the Club Chart." 

A reviewer from People Magazine felt it "has the same potential" to become a No. 1 R&B hit [as "Humpin' Around"]. In an retrospective review, Pop Rescue remarked that it "at times" reminds of "Boom! Shake the Room" by DJ Jazzy Jeff and the Fresh Prince. Ralph Tee from the RM Dance Update wrote, "With K-Klass on the mix, the track now boasts sparkling pianos, bright snares, thudding house bassline and crispy handclaps as an accompaniment to parts of the original vocal that at times seems removed from its surroundings. After breaking down for a rap section atop some contrasting funky drummer style rhythms, the track is then left to build once again to a storming climax." He also added that it "looks like [becoming] Bobby's first house hit." Another editor, James Hamilton, described it as "piano plonked [and] jiggly striding".

Impact and legacy
In October 2018, Time Out ranked "Two Can Play That Game" at No. 30 in their "The 100 Best Party Songs" list, adding: 

"We don’t know who the harlot was that broke Bobby’s heart, but we’re glad she did. In cooking up a dish of sweet revenge, Boston’s Robert Brown unwittingly created one of the biggest party tunes of all time. The track may have started out as a smooth R&B gem, but less than a year after its release it was transformed by Welsh producers K-Klass into the piano house banger we’ve all been doing the running man to ever since."

Track listing
 "Two Can Play That Game" (K Klassic radio mix) – 3:31
 "Two Can Play That Game" (K Klassic mix) – 7:17
 "Two Can Play That Game" (The Games Over mix) – 5:18
 "Two Can Play That Game" (Pharmaceutical dub) – 6:22
 "Two Can Play That Game" (DJ Gem Cunnington ReMix) – 3:29
 "Two Can Play That Game" (2B3 Can Play That Game mix) – 4:45

Charts

Weekly charts

Year-end charts

Certifications

Release history

References

1992 songs
1994 singles
1995 singles
Bobby Brown songs
MCA Records singles
Songs written by Bernard Belle
Songs written by Bobby Brown
Songs written by Teddy Riley